Sarafa Bazaar (English: Sarafa Market) is a jewellery market and night street food court located in central Indore, India. Sarafa is one of the market in India which remains as a jewellery marketplace at daytime and converts itself into a street food court at night. The market consists of two sub-markets namely Bada Sarafa Bazaar and Chhota Sarafa Bazaar. Indore's Sarafa Bazaar is a popular tourist place because of its cuisine and night lifestyle.

History
The market originated as the central jewellery market in the city of Indore. Located 2 Kilometres from Indore's central marketplace Rajwada, Sarafa was the central trading point for jewellery, artefacts and ornaments. Due to its location and a large number of commuters and tourists, street food vendors started putting stalls and selling fast-food, snacks and chaat. Eventually, street food vendors were allowed to put stalls after 8 PM (after jewellery market closes) until morning. Sarafa is also the place of origin of Bada Sarafa Cotton Association, Indore and Madhya Pradesh Sarafa Association.

Cuisine
The following are the most popular recipes for with the court is famous for:
 Bhutte ka Kees
 Jalebi
 Ratalu
 Khopra Pattice
 Garadu
 Poha-Jalebi
 Malpua
 Rabri
 kachori vijay chat house
 Kulfi
 Mawa Baati
 Malai Rabdi
 Coconut Crush

Some popular vendors include Joshi Ke Dahi Bade (since 1977) (Joshi's Dahi Bade), Nagori Ki Shikanji (Nagori's Shikanjvi) and Rajhans ka Daal Bafla (Rajhans' Daal Baati).

Sarafa in Smart City Project

Smart City Indore is an initiative launched by Indore Municipal Corporation, which includes the participation of residents to qualify Indore to the Smart City Mission launched by the Government of India in first round by taking suggestions and feedback from the residents. Indore is shortlisted by the Ministry of Urban Development as one of the 100 cities under Smart City Mission. The project aims to emphasize development in various sectors including Governance, Transportation, Energy & Waste Management, Water Management, Finance, Health & Education, Infrastructure, and Heritage.

Sarafa Bazaar and the Rajwada suburb are selected as the regions to be developed under the initiative. The Indore Municipal Corporation and Indore Development Authority have started working on underground ducts for the overhead cables in the region.

References

Bazaars
Bazaars in India
Culture of Indore
Tourist attractions in Indore